Goshen Road was an early road that ran from Old Shawneetown, Illinois, on the Ohio River, northwest to the Goshen Settlement, near Glen Carbon, Illinois, near the Mississippi River. In the early 19th century, this was the main east/west road in Illinois.

History 
Goshen Road started as a natural, or pioneer, trace: a route that was used by Native Americans and migrating animals. The road was not a definite, marked out path. It was, rather, a collection of vague, parallel paths that crossed, shifting with the season and over the years.

Eventually the demand for salt solidified the road's importance. "The builders of Goshen Road looked east, striving toward a place where they could obtain their necessity - salt," wrote historian Barbara Burr Hubbs. Salt was one of the dearest commodities that early settlers had and one of the most difficult to obtain. Settlers at Goshen at one time bought it eagerly for $9 a barrel. Hubbs explains further:
"In the east beyond the Ohio, men looked west, striving toward new homes and better living . . . The Goshen Road funneled new residents into Illinois Territory at such a rate, its citizens became ambitious to have a state. They came by horse-drawn wagons, by two-wheeled ox-carts; they rode horses and donkeys and 'shank's mares;' they pushed wheelbarrows and carried their wealth on their backs. But they came and many stayed. Not all went the length of the road, but in 1818 when a census was taken to determine whether the Illinois population was sufficient for statehood, settlers lined the old route. It was a belt settlement from the Ohio at Shawneetown to the Mississippi at Alton . . . All across the state the generation whose fathers had traveled the Goshen Road blessed the men of Goshen who needed salt and built a road." 

John Reynolds, later Governor of Illinois, adds, "In the fall of 1808 a wagon road was laid off from Goshen settlement to the Ohio River salt works which in olden times was called The Goshen Road." The southern stretch of the road was permanently laid out in an interesting way to find a direct route without surveying. They led a mare a day's journey away from her foal - then turned her loose. Rough blazes were cut on trees as the mare took the instinctive straightest course back to her foal.

Route 
Beginning around 1800, the Illinois Territory was surveyed pursuant to the Land Ordinance of 1785. Because this survey was aimed at establishing the Township and Section boundaries, the surveyors were not paid for mapping roads. However, many did show the locations of roads. Because the Goshen Road was often the only noteworthy feature at the time of the original survey, the road was noted in many of these surveys. Because these surveys marked only the Section boundaries, we often have an accurate location of the road only at one-mile (1.6 km) intervals.

Goshen Road generally followed the Saline River watershed in a northwesterly direction until it met the Big Muddy River/Saline River divide, which was also the Mississippi River/Ohio River divide. It then followed that divide in a northwesterly direction, avoiding a crossing of the swamps around the Big Muddy River. The road finally crossed the Big Muddy watershed in northern Jefferson County. The road then crossed the Kaskaskia Bottoms, which could not be avoided, on a fairly direct line toward the Goshen Settlement, in the Glen Carbon area.

Gallatin and Saline Counties
The old maps do not provide a location for the Goshen Road in Gallatin and Saline Counties. The road from Old Shawneetown to the salt works at Equality is shown, skirting the Shawnee Hills to the south of modern Illinois Route 13. Although the road probably ran from Equality toward Eldorado, there is no trace on the old maps.

Hamilton County
From the south, the original survey of Illinois first shows the Goshen Road cutting across the southwestern corner of McLeansboro Township, following the divide between two minor watersheds of the Saline River. No trace of the road remains in this area. From there, the road is shown entering Knight's Prairie.

Goshen Road ran northwesterly across Knight's Prairie Township in western Hamilton County. The route is marked by a series of modern roads that do not follow the surveyed section lines. The road ran past the modern Ten Mile Creek State Fish and Wildlife Area, appropriately named the "Goshen Trail Unit".

One of the earliest settlers in Hamilton County was William Hardisty, who recorded a land claim in Knight's Prairie, adjacent to the road, in 1819. Hardisty was living in Washington County, Kentucky as late as 1815, but held public office in Hamilton County by 1820.

In western Hamilton County, Goshen Road roughly followed the divide between the Big Muddy River and Wabash River.
Knight's Prairie Township Topographic Map
Mt. Nebo Cemetery Topographic Map

Jefferson County
The earliest settler in Jefferson County was Andrew Moore, who located next to the road in 1810, near the southeast corner of the County. The Goshen Road entered the county near the southeast corner, from Hamilton County. The road exits that County as a beautifully preserved pioneer road, continuing several miles into Jefferson County as a more modern road that does not follow the Section boundaries.

The original Goshen Road turned north toward modern Opdyke, following the Big Muddy/Wabash Divide. Although the road that continues northwest toward Mt. Vernon is named "Goshen Road", it is the "Old State Highway" that was built some decades later. The original road circled around what was to become Mt. Vernon, in order to avoid the impassable swamps to the south and west of the City.

The location of the Goshen Road has been fairly well mapped across Jefferson County by Hank Lee. Signs displaying an ornate "G" have been placed along modern roads close to where the old road passed. There is some confusion in Jefferson County because the County has assigned the "Goshen Road" name to roads that were built at later dates.

As shown on the original survey of Illinois, the original Goshen Road ran straight north through the center of what eventually became the village of Opdyke, which came into existence when the east/west railroad was built through town, in the 1880s. The main north/south road today is the Section road to the west of town. All that is left of the Goshen Road is a three-block street that crosses the railroad tracks, and then goes nowhere.

From Opdyke the road ran northward toward its first difficult creek crossing: Two Mile Creek. The road was poorly mapped in this area in the original survey, and no trace seems to remain. Across the Creek, the road turned eastward somewhere near Marlow. The stretch of road running northwest near Marlow is a segment of the old Road, as mapped on the original survey.

There are traces of an old road that runs through the cemetery at Hopewell Church, near Miller Lake. The local legend identifies this as the Goshen Road.

From Hopewell Church, the road ran northwest toward modern Miller Lake. It crossed Casey Creek to the south of the dam. Deep wagon ruts are visible where the road climbed the bluff to the west of Casey Creek. This may have been an ancient defensive mound built to control this crossing point.

From the Casey Creek crossing, the road ran northwest to modern Dix. Although the original survey of Illinois mapped the road in this area, few traces remain. Northwest of Dix, the road generally followed the line of what became the Southern Railway. A line of old roads parallels the tracks, a little to the north. It is not clear if any one of these is the old road, or if these roads were built after the railroad obliterated the old road when the railroad was built around 1900.

Goshen Road exited Jefferson County near Walnut Hill.
TopoQuest, SE Corner Jefferson County
TopoQuest, Sugar Creek, Moores Prairie
TopoQuest, Opdyke, Illinois
TopoQuest, Marlow, Illinois
TopoQuest, Hopewell Church
TopoQuest, Casey Creek Crossing
TopoQuest, Northwest of Dix

Marion County
The Goshen Road entered Marion County just to the south of Walnut Hill. 
It crossed the Fort Kaskaskia/Fort Vincennes Road at Walnut Hill. 

The modern road that runs northwest out of Walnut Hill toward Centralia appears to be a segment of the Goshen Road, corresponding almost exactly with the road shown on the original township surveys. This road meets U.S. Route 51 just south of Centralia.
TopoQuest, Walnut Hill, Illinois
TopoQuest, South of Centralia

Madison County
The Goshen Settlement was located in what became Madison County.

A modern road to the south of Edwardsville is called the "Goshen Road", and is said to be a segment of the old road. This connects Illinois Route 143 with Route 159. This road is near the upper reaches of Judy's Creek. From there, the road probably followed the creek valley down to the Goshen Settlement, which was located at the base of the bluff, where Judy's Creek enters the American Bottom on its way to the Mississippi River.
TopoQuest, Edwardsville to Goshen Settlement

References

External links
History of Glen Carbon, Illinois
Maps from original Survey of Illinois

Pre-statehood history of Illinois
Historic trails and roads in Illinois